Rutvikbhai Lavjibhai Makwana is an Indian politician. He serves as Member of legislative assembly from Chotila constituency. He is a member of the Indian National Congress. Makwana defeated the BJP's Dervaliya Zinabhai Najabhai in the 2017 election. He was appointed chief organiser of 'Gujarat Pradesh Seva Dal' by Rahul Gandhi in October 2018.

In March 2021, he was arrested by police for his tractor yatra against Narendra Modi in Gujarat. Mr. Makwana belong to the Koli caste of Gujarat state of India.

References 

1975 births
Living people
Indian National Congress politicians from Gujarat